The 2012 United States House of Representatives elections in Colorado were held on Tuesday, November 6, 2012 to elect the seven U.S. representatives from the state, one from each of the state's seven congressional districts. The elections coincided with the elections of other federal and state offices, including a quadrennial presidential election. Primary elections were held on June 26, 2012.

Overview

Redistricting
During the redistricting process, Republicans argued for minimal changes to the existing map while Democrats pushed for more competitive districts. After a committee of ten members of the Colorado General Assembly failed to draw a map, in November 2011 Judge Robert Hyatt ruled in favor of Democrats' proposals. In December 2011, the Colorado Supreme Court affirmed Hyatt's ruling.

District 1
Colorado's 1st congressional district, which has been represented by Democrat Diana DeGette since 1997, was not significantly modified in redistricting and continues to be based in Denver. The new 1st district includes Ken Caryl and Cherry Hills Village.

Democratic primary

Candidates

Nominee
Diana DeGette, incumbent U.S. Representative

Primary results

Republican primary

Candidates

Nominee
Danny Stroud, Army Major

Eliminated in primary
Richard Murphy

Primary results

General election

Results

District 2
In redistricting, Larimer County, home to Fort Collins, was added to Colorado's 2nd congressional district, which has been represented by Democrat Jared Polis since 2009 and is still based in Boulder.

Democratic primary

Candidates

Nominee
Jared Polis, incumbent U.S. Representative

Primary results

Republican primary

Candidates

Nominee
Kevin Lundberg, state senator

Eliminated in primary
Eric Weissmann, businessman

Primary results

General election

Endorsements

Results

District 3
In redistricting, Colorado's 3rd congressional district, which stretches from Pueblo to Grand Junction, was made slightly more favorable to Democrats. Part of Eagle County was added to the district, while Las Animas County was removed from it.

Republican primary

Candidates

Nominee
Scott Tipton, incumbent U.S. Representative

Primary results

Democratic primary
Democrat John Salazar, who represented the district from 2005 until 2011, said in December 2010 that he was considering seeking a rematch against Republican Scott Tipton, to whom he lost his seat in 2010. He commented "We're thinking that we might run again in two years, but who knows? I'm keeping all options open. We've been offered a possibility of serving at many other places, or there's a great possibility of going back to the ranch and raising cattle." In January 2011, Governor John Hickenlooper appointed Salazar to serve as Colorado Agriculture Commissioner.

On May 19, 2011, Democratic state representative Sal Pace said he was "likely to put a campaign together", having met with U.S. House minority whip Steny Hoyer. On May 31, Pace declared his intention to challenge Tipton. Hoyer also suggested the name of Perry Haney, a surgeon, as a potential candidate; however Haney later formed an exploratory committee to run in the 6th district but withdrew from the race in February 2012.

Candidates

Nominee
Sal Pace, state representative

Declined
 Perry Haney, surgeon
John Salazar, former U.S. Representative

Primary results

Libertarian primary

Primary results

Tisha Casida, a businesswoman, ran as an independent candidate.

General election

Endorsements

Polling

Predictions

Results

District 4
After redistricting, Colorado's 4th congressional district continued to strongly favor Republicans. It lost Fort Collins to the 2nd District; as a result, the largest city in the district is now Greeley. Republican incumbent Cory Gardner, who was first elected to represent Colorado's 4th congressional district in 2010, raised over $300,000 in the first quarter of 2011.

Republican primary

Candidates

Nominee
Cory Gardner, incumbent U.S. Representative

Primary results

Democratic primary

Candidates

Nominee
Brandon Shaffer, president of the Colorado Senate

Declined
Betsy Markey, assistant secretary for intergovernmental affairs in the U.S. Department of Homeland Security and former U.S. Representative

Primary results

Constitution primary

Primary results

General election

Polling

Results

District 5
Colorado's 5th congressional district, which has been represented by Republican Doug Lamborn since 2007, was not significantly modified in redistricting and is still centered in Colorado Springs. It is expected to continue to strongly favor Republicans.

Republican primary

Candidates

Nominee
Doug Lamborn, incumbent U.S. Representative

Eliminated in primary
Robert Blaha, businessman
Doug Bergeron, Insurance Agent

Primary results

Democratic primary

Candidates

Withdrawn
Bob Evans

Constitution primary

Primary results

General election
The Republican candidate did not see a Democratic challenger, as Democratic candidate Bob Evans suspended his campaign.

However, Jim Pirtle (Libertarian), Kenneth R. Harvell (American Constitution), and Dave Anderson (No Party Affiliation) all challenged the Republican Party nominee.

Results

District 6
In redistricting, Colorado's 6th congressional district was made more favorable to Democrats. While the 6th has leaned Republican since its creation in 1983, the new 6th's population will be evenly split between Democrats, Republicans and unaffiliated voters. All of Aurora was added to the district. Republican Mike Coffman has represented the 6th district since 2009.

Republican primary

Candidates

Nominee
Mike Coffman, incumbent U.S. Representative

Primary results

Democratic primary

Candidates

Nominee
Joe Miklosi, state representative

Withdrawn
Perry Haney, chiropractor

Declined
Morgan Carroll, state senator
John Morse, majority leader of the state senate
Andrew Romanoff, former speaker of the Colorado House of Representatives
Brandon Shaffer, tpresident of the Colorado Senate (running in the 4th district)

Primary results

General election

Endorsements

Polling

Predictions

Results

District 7
Colorado's 7th congressional district, which has been represented by Democrat Ed Perlmutter since 2007, was modified in redistricting to include the more populated suburbs of Adams County.

Democratic primary

Candidates

Nominee
Ed Perlmutter, incumbent U.S. Representative

Primary results

Republican primary

Candidates

Nominee
Joe Coors Jr, brother of 2004 U.S. Senate candidate Pete Coors

Primary results

Constitution primary

Primary results

General election

Endorsements

Polling

Predictions

Results

References

External links
 Elections & Voting from the Colorado Secretary of State
 United States House of Representatives elections in Colorado, 2012 at Ballotpedia
 Campaign contributions at OpenSecrets
 Outside spending at the Sunlight Foundation

2012
Colorado
United States House of Representatives